Olenidae is a family of ptychopariid trilobites. Some genera, Balnibarbi and Cloacaspis, are thought to have evolved a symbiotic relationship with sulfur-eating bacteria from which they derived nutrition.

Genera 

Acerocare
Acerocarina
Aciculolenus
Anaximander
Angelina =Keidelaspis),
Apoplanias
Asilluchus
Baikonuraspis
Balnibarbi
Bienvillia (=Diatemnus; =Mendoparabolina)
Boeckaspis (/Boeckia BROGGER; =Sphaerophthalmella)
Bondarevites
Bulbolenus
Chekiangaspis
Cloacaspis
Ctenopyge
Cyclognathina
Danarcus
Desmetia
Eoctenopyge
Euonchonotina
Eurycare
Granitzia
Hancrania
Helieranella
Highgatella
Huangshiaspis
Hunanolenus
Hypermecaspis (=Spitsbergaspis),
Inkouia (=Agalatus),
Isidrella
Jujuyaspis (=Alimbetaspis),
Leiobienvillia
Leptoplastides (=Andesaspis;=Beltella; =Chunkingaspis; =Parabolinopsis; *Rampartaspis),
Leptoplastus
Leurostega
Magnomma
Mesoctenopyge
Moxomia
Neoolenus
Neoparabolina
Nericiaspis
Olenus (=Simulolenus),
Orkekeia
Parabolina (/*Odontopyge),
Parabolinella
Parabolinina
Parabolinites
Paraolenus
Paraplicatolina
Peltocare
Peltura (/Anthes; =Anopocare),
Pelturina
Plicatolina
Plicatolinella
Porterfieldia
Prohedinella
Protopeltura
Psilocara
Remizites
Rhodonaspis
Saltaspis
Shihuigouia
Sphaerophthalmus
Svalbardites
Talbotinella
Triarthrus (/*Brongniartia EATON)?
Ullaspis
Westergaardia (=Sphaerophthalmoides)
Westergaardites
Wujiajiania.

References

External links 

Olenidae at Fossilworks

Olenina
Trilobite families